The International Fellowship of Christian Magicians was formed in 1953 by a group of individuals interested in sharing the Gospel using sleight of hand illusions.  Since its beginnings in California it has grown into an international organization with thousands of members.  These members are not only performers of Gospel magic, but also entertainers across the world, secular and gospel, that are members of the Christian faith.  Notable members include entertainers like Andre Kole, Duane Laflin, Randy Christensen, Kenrick "ICE" McDonald, Scott Wolf, and others.

Many of its members are involved in ministries that not only share the Gospel and entertain through the use of illusions but also by using puppetry, ventriloquism, clowning, balloon sculpturing, drama, storytelling, chalk art, face art, juggling and other visual arts; as a result they include all these art forms at our training conventions, regional conferences and in their magazine, The Voice.

The International Fellowship of Christian Magicians has an annual convention that moves across the country, but is currently held in Indianapolis, Indiana.  Their website is found at www.FCM.org.

Leadership 

The current President of the organization is Jamie Doyle.
1st Vice President: P.J. Weber
2nd Vice President: Greg Phillips
Treasurer: Andrew Anderson
Secretary: Beth Salo
Immediate Past President: Joey Evans 

Past Living Presidents
 Joey Evans Former President
Steve Varro Former President
Duane Laflin Former President
Del Wilson Former President
Len Camp Former President
Ed Jarvis Former President
Jerry Burgess Former President

References

External links 

Christian organizations based in the United States
Magic organizations